TCF Financial Corporation was a Wayzata, Minnesota-based  national bank holding company until 2019, when it was purchased by the Chemical Financial Corporation, which adopted the TCF name. As of December 31, 2013, TCF had $18.4 billion in total assets and nearly 430 branches in Minnesota, Illinois, Michigan, Colorado, Wisconsin, Indiana, Arizona, and South Dakota, providing retail and commercial banking services.  TCF, through its subsidiaries, also conducted commercial leasing and equipment finance business in all 50 states, commercial inventory finance business in the United States and Canada, and indirect auto finance business in 45 states.

Subsidiaries
Banking:
TCF Bank
Leasing:
TCF Equipment Finance
Winthrop Resources Corporation
Inventory Finance:
TCF Inventory Finance, Inc.
TCF Commercial Finance Canada, Inc.
Auto Finance:
Gateway One Lending & Finance, LLC
Philanthropy:
TCF Foundation

Officers
Craig R. Dahl, President, Chief Executive Officer, Chairman of the Board
Thomas F. Jasper, Vice Chairman of the Board & Chief Operations Officer
Brian W. Maass, Executive Vice President, Chief Financial Officer, Chief Investment Officer, Treasurer
Thomas J. Butterfield, Executive Vice President & Chief Information Officer
Michael S. Jones, Executive Vice President - Consumer Banking, Retail Lending, and Gateway One Lending & Finance

History

TCF Financial Corporation began business in 1923 as Twin City Building and Loan Association. In 1936 it was given a federal charter and renamed as Twin City Federal Savings and Loan Association. The company went public in 1986 chartered under the name TCF Banking and Savings, F.A. (TCF Bank).  A year later, it reorganized as a holding company, TCF Financial Corporation.

In the 1990s, the company expanded banking into Michigan through the acquisitions of First Federal Savings Bank of Oakland County and Great Lakes National Bank. 1997 saw the acquisition of Winthrop Resources Corporation and 2004 saw the acquisition of VGM Leasing, Inc.  In 2008, TCF entered the commercial inventory finance business in the U.S. and Canada with the creation of TCF Inventory Finance, Inc.  TCF then entered the indirect auto finance business with the acquisition of Gateway One Lending & Finance in 2011.

On January 28, 2019, Chemical Bank of Detroit announced it would merge with TCF. The new corporation will retain the TCF name, but be headquartered in the tower Chemical is constructing in Detroit.  It will maintain large operating centers in Minneapolis and Midland, Michigan.

Operations
TCF's primary funding source for its loan and lease growth is its low cost, core deposit base.  TCF offers various banking services: checking; traditional, supermarket and campus branches; debit cards with Apple Pay, coin counting and withdrawals at ATMs; and TCF Online Banking and Mobile Banking.

TCF maintains a well-diversified loan and lease portfolio by business unit, segment, geography, rate, duration and collateral type.  TCF's loan and lease portfolio consists of consumer real estate, commercial, leasing and equipment finance, inventory finance and auto finance.

External links

TCF Bank website

Notes and references

External links

Companies formerly listed on the New York Stock Exchange
Economy of the Midwestern United States
Economy of the Southwestern United States
Banks based in Minnesota
Wayzata, Minnesota
American companies established in 1923
Banks established in 1923
Banks disestablished in 2019
2019 mergers and acquisitions
1923 establishments in Minnesota